Kosunen is a Finnish surname. Notable people with the surname include:

Kalevi Kosunen (born 1947), Finnish boxer
Olli Herman Kosunen (better known as H. Olliver Twisted; born 1983), Finnish singer

Finnish-language surnames